"Stupid Little Things" is a single released by American singer-songwriter Anastacia in April 2014. It was taken from her sixth studio album Resurrection on the Sanctuary/BMG label in Germany. It was her first original release in five and half years. The single was moderately successful, charting in Belgium, Italy, Germany and Switzerland.

Critical reception 
"Stupid Little Things" received acclaim from music critics. Directlyrics called the single "excellent" and viewed it as Anastacia's best song since "Left Outside Alone". MuuMuse praised the song as "an almighty return, and she sounds as defiant as ever. It's nice to hear those pipes wailing out from the speakers, yeah? Break out those tinted glasses — Anastacia’s back." Popjustice rated the song eight out of 10. MTV's Brad Stern included it in his "5 Must-Hear Pop Songs of the Week!", stating that it was a "return to form" from the "pop princess and proof that Anastacia's a true survivor", after her second battle with breast cancer.

Music video
The official music video was uploaded on March 21, 2014.

Track listing
"Stupid Little Things" – 3:55
"Stupid Little Things" (Radio Edit) – 3:31
"Stupid Little Things" (Instrumental) – 3:55
"Dark White Girl" – 3:23

Charts

Certifications

Release history

References

2014 singles
Anastacia songs
2014 songs
Songs written by Anastacia
Songs written by Sam Watters
Songs written by Louis Biancaniello
Sanctuary Records singles
Songs about heartache
Songs written by Courtney Harrell